The following lists events that happened in 1953 in Iceland.

Incumbents
President – Ásgeir Ásgeirsson
Prime Minister – Steingrímur Steinþórsson, Ólafur Thors

Events
The year 1953 in Iceland was mostly remembered due to the Cambridge Langjökull Expedition which involved exploring the "Ok" volcano known for erupting in the Pleistocene era.

Births

9 February – Egill Ólafsson,  singer, songwriter and actor
19 February – Hannes Hólmsteinn Gissurarson, political scientist
1 May – Ragnheiður Gestsdóttir, children's writer
19 June – Össur Skarphéðinsson, politician
26 June – Kristján L. Möller, politician.
15 December – Herbert Guðmundsson, singer-songwriter

Deaths

References

 
1950s in Iceland
Iceland
Iceland
Years of the 20th century in Iceland